Rocky Shahan (March 4, 1919 – December 8, 1981) was an American actor and stuntman. He was a regular cast member of Rawhide.  In 1957, he had a rare integral & speaking part as Dodge’s stagecoach driver “Hank” in the ending of an episode of  Gunsmoke (“Jesse”-S3E6).

Selected filmography

Selected Television

References

External links

1919 births
1981 deaths
People from Texas
Male actors from Texas
American stunt performers
American male television actors
American male film actors
20th-century American male actors
Western (genre) television actors